Aldona Ličkutė-Jusionienė  (1928–2007) was a Lithuanian painter.

See also
List of Lithuanian painters

References
Universal Lithuanian Encyclopedia

1928 births
2007 deaths
Artists from Vilnius
20th-century Lithuanian painters